Urosaurus bicarinatus is a species of lizard. The common name for this species is the tropical tree lizard. Its range is in Mexico.

References 

Urosaurus
Reptiles of Mexico
Reptiles described in 1856
Taxa named by Auguste Duméril